Rugby ATL is a professional rugby union team in Major League Rugby (MLR) from Atlanta, that began play in 2020.

History
On September 21, 2018, Major League Rugby announced that Atlanta was one of the expansion teams joining the league for the 2020 season. The team name Rugby ATL was revealed on February 26, 2019.

Sponsorship

Roster

The Rugby ATL squad for the 2023 Major League Rugby season is:

 Senior 15s internationally capped players are listed in bold.
 MLR teams are allowed to field up to ten overseas players per match.

Head coaches
  Scott Lawrence (2020-2022)
  Stephen Brett (2022–)

Assistant coaches
  Stephen Brett (Attack, 2020–2021)
  Blake Bradford (2022–)

Captains

Matt Heaton (2020–present) (co-captain)
Ryan Nell (2020–present) (co-captain)

Records

Season standings

404 Rugby (2019)
Rugby ATL started with an exhibition side, called 404 Rugby. From September to November 2019, 404 Rugby played exhibition matches against Mystic River, NYAC, Old Blue, and USA Rugby men's club champions Life University.

2019 roster

2019 season
All games in the 2019 season were exhibition games and did not count in the MLR standings.

2020 season

On March 12, 2020, MLR announced the season would go on hiatus immediately for 30 days due to fears surrounding the 2019–2020 coronavirus pandemic.  It was cancelled the following week

Regular season

2021 season

Regular season

Post season

2022 season

Regular season

Postseason

References

External links
 
 Rugby United New York 31-24 Rugby ATL (photo gallery) at Rugbychampagneweb

 
Major League Rugby teams
Rugby clubs established in 2018
Sports teams in Atlanta
Rugby union in Georgia (U.S. state)
Rugby union teams in Georgia (U.S. state)
2018 establishments in Georgia (U.S. state)